Ceuthmochares is a genus of 2 species of cuckoos in the family Cuculidae. The two species were once treated as a single species, known as the yellowbill. Both species are found in evergreen forest in Africa. Although they are cuckoos they are not brood parasites. This indicates that they do not lay their eggs in the nests of other bird species.

Species

Cuculidae
Bird genera
 
Taxonomy articles created by Polbot